"Praise God I'm Satisfied" is a traditional gospel blues song recorded in 1929 by Blind Willie Johnson (vocals and guitar) and Willie B. Harris (vocals), who is thought to have been his first wife.

Other recordings

2002K. M. Williams, on the album Blind Willie's Hymns
 2004Gary Lucas and Peter Stampfel, on the album Dark Was the Night: A Tribute to the Music of Blind Willie Johnson

References

Blind Willie Johnson songs
1929 songs
Blues songs
Gospel songs